Joseph Chievous (born July 3, 1967) is a retired American professional basketball player. During his pro club career, he played at the small forward position. Chievous played three seasons in the National Basketball Association, after being selected by the Houston Rockets, in the first round, with the 16th overall pick of the 1988 NBA draft.

College career
Chevious played college basketball at University of Missouri, with the Missouri Tigers, from 1984 to 1988. He led the Tigers to three NCAA Tournament appearances. He also led them to Big Eight regular-season and tournament titles.

Chevious became the school's all-time scoring leader with 2,580 points over his collegiate career. Chevious was inducted into the University of Missouri Intercollegiate Athletics Hall of Fame as part of the Class of 1996. On November 1, 2012, it was announced that Chevious would be part of the "Class of 2012" inducted into the Missouri Sports Hall of Fame on November 15. On February 19, 2019, during a ceremony at halftime of a game between Missouri and Kentucky, the university retired Chevious’ number 3 jersey.

Professional career
Chievous was selected by the Houston Rockets, in the first round, with the 16th overall pick of the 1988 NBA draft. Chevious played in the NBA from 1988 to 1991, with the Houston Rockets and Cleveland Cavaliers. His best NBA season came in his rookie year, when he appeared in 81 games and averaged 9.3 points per game.

Personal life
Chevious' son Quinton Chievous (b. 1992), played college basketball at the University of Tennessee and Hampton University.

See also
List of NCAA Division I men's basketball career free throw scoring leaders

References

External links
Derrick Chievous NBA statistics, basketballreference.com
Derrick Chievous CBA statistics, statscrew.com

1967 births
Living people
African-American basketball players
Albany Patroons players
All-American college men's basketball players
American expatriate basketball people in Argentina
American expatriate basketball people in Cyprus
American expatriate basketball people in Greece
American expatriate basketball people in the Philippines
American expatriate basketball people in Spain
American men's basketball players
APOEL B.C. players
Cleveland Cavaliers players
Dafnis B.C. players
Holy Cross High School (Flushing) alumni
Houston Rockets draft picks
Houston Rockets players
Independiente de General Pico basketball players
McDonald's High School All-Americans
Missouri Tigers men's basketball players
Parade High School All-Americans (boys' basketball)
Philippine Basketball Association imports
Quad City Thunder players
Quilmes de Mar del Plata basketball players
Rapid City Thrillers players
San Miguel Beermen players
Small forwards
Basketball players from New York City
Universiade medalists in basketball
Universiade silver medalists for the United States
21st-century African-American people
20th-century African-American sportspeople